RCD Mallorca B, S.A.D. is a Spanish football team based in Palma, Majorca, in the Balearic Islands. Founded in 1967, it is the reserve team of RCD Mallorca and currently plays in Segunda Federación – Group 3, holding home matches at Estadi Son Bibiloni, with a capacity of 1,500 seats.

Unlike in England, reserve teams in Spain play in the same football pyramid as their senior team rather than a separate league.

History

Background
As farm team:
Mallorca Atlético - (1983–93)
As reserve team:
RCD Mallorca "B" - (1993–)

Other farm clubs
Atlético de Palma - (1961–65)
CF Palma - (1965–72)
UD Collerense - (1981–83)

Season to season
UD Collerense (farm team in 1981–82 and 1982–83)

Mallorca Atlético, farm team

Mallorca B, reserve team

1 season in Segunda División
18 seasons in Segunda División B
1 season in Segunda Federación
23 seasons in Tercera División
1 season in Tercera División RFEF

Honours
Tercera División: (9) 1984–85, 1985–86, 1988–89, 1993–94, 1994–95, 2008–09, 2013–14, 2015–16, 2017–18
Copa Federación: (1) 1995–96

Current squad
.

From Youth Academy

Out on loan

References

External links
RCD Mallorca official website
Futbolme team profile 

RCD Mallorca
Spanish reserve football teams
Football clubs in the Balearic Islands
Association football clubs established in 1967
Sport in Palma de Mallorca
1967 establishments in Spain
Segunda División clubs